Chantoozies is the debut studio album by Australian group Chantoozies. The album was released in August 1988 by Mushroom Records and peaked at number 6 on the ARIA Charts. It is the only full-length studio album to feature founding member Tottie Goldsmith.

Track listing
 LP (L 93279)

Charts

Weekly charts

Year-end Charts

Certifications

References

1988 debut albums
Mushroom Records albums
Synth-pop albums by Australian artists
Chantoozies albums